Dashow is a surname. Notable people with the surname include:

James Dashow (born 1944), American composer
Ken Dashow (born 1958), American writer, performer, and director